James Cavendish (circa 1749 – January 1808) was an Anglo-Irish politician.

Cavendish sat in the Irish House of Commons as the Member of Parliament for Lifford between 1773 and 1776, before sitting for Banagher from 1776 to 1783.

References

Year of birth unknown
1808 deaths
18th-century Anglo-Irish people
James
Irish MPs 1769–1776
Irish MPs 1776–1783
Members of the Parliament of Ireland (pre-1801) for County Donegal constituencies
Members of the Parliament of Ireland (pre-1801) for King's County constituencies
Year of birth uncertain